is a Japanese fashion model. She is represented with Asia Promotion.

Biography
In March 1996, Kondo graduated from Kazo City Hanazaki Kita Kindergarten. Later in April, she entered Kasumi City Hanasaki Kita Elementary School.

Kondo graduated from Sugiyama Jogakuen University.

She became popular after becoming an exclusive model for S Cawaii!, and later appearered in a cover for the first time. Kondo also served as a cover girl, in which those covers topped about 600,000 copies.

Currently, she is also active in variety shows.

Kondo married on 5 September 2015. She married Hirohisa Ota of the comedy trio Jungle Pocket.

Filmography

Magazines

TV programmes

Events

Films

Music videos

Bibliography

References

External links
 

Japanese female models
Japanese television personalities
People from Okayama Prefecture
1989 births
Living people